Gagauz Halkı ("Gagauz People") was a Gagauz separatist political party in Moldova. The Moldovan government outlawed the party two days after declaring such secession movements to be unconstitutional.

The party supported the 1991 Soviet coup d'etat attempt and strongly opposed the possible idea of the unification of the Moldovan SSR and Romania.

See also
 Gagauzia conflict

References

Banned secessionist parties
Defunct political parties in Moldova
Gagauzia conflict
Separatism in Moldova
Independence movements
Pro-independence parties
Anti-Romanian sentiment
Pro-Russian militant groups